Sadegh Hedayat (17 February 1903 – 9 April 1951) was an Iranian writer and translator. Best known for his novel The Blind Owl, he was one of the earliest Iranian writers to adopt literary modernism in their career.

Early life and education

Hedayat was born to a northern Iranian aristocratic family in Tehran. His great-grandfather Reza-Qoli Khan Hedayat Tabarestani was a well-respected writer and worked in the government, as did other relatives. Hedayat's sister married Haj Ali Razmara who was an army general and among the prime ministers of Iran under Shah Mohammad Reza Pahlavi. Another one of his sisters was the wife of Abdollah Hedayat who was also an army general.

Hedayat was educated at Collège Saint-Louis (French catholic school) and Dar ol-Fonoon (1914–1916). In 1925, he was among a select few students who traveled to Europe to continue their studies. There, he initially went on to study engineering in Belgium, which he abandoned after a year to study architecture in France. There he gave up architecture in turn to pursue dentistry. In this period he became acquainted with Thérèse, a Parisian with whom he had a love affair. In 1927 Hedayat attempted suicide by throwing himself into the Marne but was rescued by a fishing boat. After four years in France, he finally surrendered his scholarship and returned home in the summer of 1930 without receiving a degree. In Iran, he held various jobs for short periods.

Career
Hedayat subsequently devoted his whole life to studying Western literature and to learning and investigating Iranian history and folklore. The works of Rainer Maria Rilke, Edgar Allan Poe, Franz Kafka, Anton Chekhov, and Guy de Maupassant intrigued him the most. During his short literary life span, Hedayat published a substantial number of short stories and novelettes, two historical dramas, a play, a travelogue, and a collection of satirical parodies and sketches. His writings also include numerous literary criticisms, studies in Persian folklore, and many translations from Middle Persian and French. He is credited with having brought the Persian language and literature into the mainstream of international contemporary writing. There is no doubt that Hedayat was the most modern of all modern writers in Iran. Yet, for Hedayat, modernity was not just a question of scientific rationality or a pure imitation of European values.

In his later years, feeling the socio-political problems of the time, Hedayat started attacking the two major causes of Iran's decimation, the monarchy, and through his stories, he tried to impute the deafness and blindness of the nation to the abuses of these two major powers. He felt alienated by everyone around him, especially by his peers, and his last published work, The Message of Kafka, bespeaks melancholy, desperation, and the sense of doom experienced by those subjected to discrimination and repression.

Hedayat traveled and stayed in India from 1936 until late 1937 (the mansion he stayed in during his visit to Bombay was identified in 2014). Hedayet spent time in Bombay learning the Pahlavi (Middle Persian) language from the Parsi Zoroastrian community of India. He was taught by Bahramgore Tahmuras Anklesaria (also spelled as Behramgore Tehmurasp Anklesaria), a renowned scholar and philologist. Nadeem Akhtar's Hedayat in India provides details of Hedayat's sojourn in India. In Bombay Hedayat completed and published his most enduring work, The Blind Owl, which he had started  writing, in Paris, as early as 1930. The book was praised by Henry Miller, André Breton, and others, and Kamran Sharareh has called it "one of the most important literary works in the Persian language".

Vegetarianism
Hedayat was a vegetarian from his youth and authored the treatise The Benefits of Vegetarianism whilst in Berlin in 1927.

Death and legacy
In 1951, overwhelmed by despair, Hedayat left Tehrān and traveled to Paris, where he rented an apartment. A few days before his death, Hedayat tore up all of his unpublished work. On 9 April 1951, he plugged all the doors and windows of his rented apartment with cotton, then turned on the gas valve, committing suicide by carbon monoxide poisoning. Two days later, his body was found by police, with a note left behind for his friends and companions that read, "I left and broke your heart. That is all." He is widely remembered as "a major symbol of Iranian nationalism."

The English poet John Heath-Stubbs published an elegy, "A Cassida for Sadegh Hedayat", in A Charm Against the Toothache in 1954.

Censorship

In November 2006, republication of Hedayat's work in uncensored form was banned in Iran, as part of a sweeping purge. However, surveillance of bookstalls is limited and it is still possible to purchase the originals second-hand. The official website is also still online. The issue of censorship is discussed in:
 "City Report: Tehran" in Frieze, issue 86, October 2004, which examines Iranian censorship in general;
 An article by Robert Tait in The Guardian, 17 November 2006;
 an article published by Radio Free Europe — Radio Liberty on 26 November 2007.

Works

Fiction
1930 Buried Alive (Zende be gūr) A collection of 9 short stories.
1931 Mongol Shadow (Sāye-ye Moqol)
1932 Three Drops of Blood (Se qatre khūn). A collection of 11 short stories.
1933 Chiaroscuro (Sāye-ye roushan) A collection of 7 short stories.
1934 Mister Bow Wow (Vagh Vagh Sahāb)
1936 Sampingé (in French)
1936 Lunatique (in French)
1936 The Blind Owl (Boof-e koor)
1942 The Stray Dog (Sag-e velgard). A collection of 8 short stories.
1943 Lady Alaviyeh (Alaviye Khānum)
1944 Velengārī (Tittle-tattle)
1944 The Elixir of Life (Āb-e Zendegi)
1945 The Pilgrim (Hājī āqā)
1946 Tomorrow (Fardā)
1947 The Pearl Cannon (Tūp-e Morvari)
Drama (1930–1946)
Parvin dokhtar-e Sāsān (Parvin, Sassan's Daughter)
Māzīyār
Afsāne-ye āfarīnesh (The Fable of Creation)
Travelogues
Esfahān nesf-e jahān (Isfahan: Half of the World)
Rū-ye jādde-ye namnāk (On the Wet Road), unpublished, written in 1935.
Studies, Criticism and Miscellanea
Rubāyyāt-e Hakim Omar-e Khayyam (Khayyam's Quatrains) 1923
Ensān va heyvān (Man and Animal) 1924
Marg (Death) 1927
Favāyed-e Giyāhkhāri (The Advantages of Vegetarianism) 1927
Hekāyat-e bā natije (The Story with a Moral) 1932
Taranehā-ye Khayyām (The Songs of Khayyam) 1934
Chāykovski (Tchaikovsky) 1940
Dar pirāmun-e Loqat-e Fārs-e Asadi (About Asadi's Persian Dictionary) 1940
Shive-ye novin dar tahqiq-e adabi (A New Method of Literary Research) 1940
Dāstan-e Nāz (The Story of Naz) 1941
Shivehā-ye novin dar she'r-e Pārsi (New Trends in Persian Poetry) 1941
A review of the film Molla Nasrud'Din 1944
A literary criticism on the Persian translation of Gogol's The Government Inspector 1944
Chand nokte dar bāre-ye Vis va Rāmin (Some Notes on Vis and Ramin) 1945
Payām-e Kāfkā (The Message of Kafka) 1948
Al-be`thatu-Islamiya ellal-belad'l Afranjiya (An Islamic Mission in the European Lands), undated.
Translations
From French:
1931 Gooseberries by Anton Chekhov
1948 In the Penal Colony by Franz Kafka
1944 Before the Law by Franz Kafka
1950 The Metamorphosis by Franz Kafka (along with Hasan Qaemian)
1950 The Wall by Jean-Paul Sartre
1950 Tales of Two Countries by Alexander Kielland
1950 Blind Geronimo and his Brother by Arthur Schnitzler
From Pahlavi:
1943 Kārname-ye Ardashir-e-Pāpākān (The Book of the Deeds of Ardashir [son of] Papakan)
1940 Gojaste Abālish
1945 Āmadan-e shāh Bahrām-e Varjavand (Return of shah Bahram Varjavand)
1944 Zand-i Wahman yasn

Films about Hedayat

 In 1987, Raul Ruiz made the feature film La Chouette aveugle in France: a loose adaption of Hedayat's novel The Blind Owl. Its formal innovations led critics and filmmakers to declare the film 'French cinema's most beautiful jewel of the past decade.'
 Hedayat's last day and the night was adapted into the short film, The Sacred and the Absurd, directed by Ghasem Ebrahimian, which was featured in the Tribeca Film Festival in 2004.
 In 2005, Iranian film director Khosrow Sinai has made a docudrama about Hedayat entitled Goftogu ba saye = Talking with a shadow. Its main theme is the influence of Western movies such as Der Golem, Nosferatu, and Dracula on Hedayat.
 In 2009, Mohsen Shahrnazdar and Sam Kalantari made a documentary film about Sadegh Hedayat named From No. 37.

See also
Intellectual movements in Iran
Persian literature
Persian philosophy

Sources
 Hassan Kamshad, Modern Persian Prose Literature 
Acquaintance with Sadegh Hedayat, by M. F. Farzaneh, Publisher: Markaz, Tehran, 2008.
Sadeq Hedayat, the foremost short story writer of Iran
The Sacred and the Absurd, a film about Hedayat's death

Further references
Homa Katouzian, Sadeq Hedayat: Life and legend of an Iranian writer, I.B. Tauris, 2000.  
Hassan Kamshad, Modern Persian Prose Literature, Ibex Publishers, 1996. 
Michael C. Hillmann, Hedayat's "The Blind Owl" Forty Years After, Middle East Monograph No. 4, Univ of Texas Press, 1978.
Iraj Bashiri, Hedayat's Ivory Tower: Structural Analysis of The Blind Owl, Minneapolis, Minnesota, 1975.
Iraj Bashiri, The Fiction of Sadeq Hedayat, 1984.
Sayers, Carol, The Blind Owl and Other Hedayat Stories, Minneapolis, Minnesota, 1984.
What is left for me from Sadegh Hedayat? Excerpt from "Sadegh Hadayat: Dar Tare Ankaboot" (In the Spider's Web), by M. F. Farzaneh, 2005.
Hedayat's last night out in Paris Excerpt from M. F. Farzaneh's "Ashenayee ba Sadegh Hedayat" (Knowning Sadegh Hedayat), 2004.

References

External links

Sadeq Hedayat's Life by Iraj Bashiri.
Sadeq Hedayat's Corner, further articles and English translations by Iraj Bashiri.
Persian Language & Literature — Sadeq Hedayat.
Hedayat's art work
Audiobooks (Ketab-e Gooya).
Hedayat Family History (in English).
Sadeq Hedayat's Heritage, Jadid Online, 17 July 2008 (in English).
 An audio slideshow (with English subtitles) by Shokā Sahrāi, with Mr Jahāngir Hedayat (son of General Isā Hedayat, Sadegh Hedayat's brother) speaking. (6 min 28 sec).

 
1903 births
1951 suicides
20th-century novelists
20th-century Iranian short story writers
Burials at Père Lachaise Cemetery
Iranian agnostics
Iranian emigrants to France
Iranian male novelists
Iranian novelists
Iranian nationalists
Iranian satirists
Iranian male short story writers
Modernism
Modernist writers
Writers from Tehran
Philosophical pessimists
Suicides by gas
Suicides in France
Vegetarianism activists
Iranian fiction writers
Linguists of Persian
Iranian translators
People from Mazandaran Province